Alan D. Schnitzer (born 1965) is an American executive and the chairman and chief executive officer of The Travelers Companies, Inc., a provider of property casualty insurance for auto, home and business.

Education
Schnitzer received a bachelor's degree from The Wharton School of the University of Pennsylvania and his J.D. from Columbia Law School.

Career
Schnitzer became a partner in the law firm Simpson Thacher & Bartlett LLP early in his career. During that time he advised on the merger of Travelers with the St. Paul Companies in 2004. 

In 2007 Schnitzer joined Travelers as vice chairman and chief legal officer and served on the company's management committees. In July 2014, he was named chief executive officer of business and international insurance with oversight of field management, corporate communications, and public policy.

Schnitzer became chief executive officer of Travelers in December 2015, and was elected chairman of the board in August 2017.

Advisory positions
Schnitzer serves as a trustee of the University of Pennsylvania, the New York City Ballet, and Memorial Sloan Kettering Cancer Center and as chair of the American Property Casualty Insurance Association.  

He is a member of the Business Roundtable and the Council on Foreign Relations. Previously he served on the U.S. Securities and Exchange Commission’s Investor Advisory Committee created under the Dodd-Frank Act.

Personal life
Schnitzer married Anne Berman, step-daughter of Robert Lipp in 1994. They met while both attended the University of Pennsylvania and have two children.

References

The Travelers Companies
Living people
Wharton School of the University of Pennsylvania alumni
1965 births
Place of birth missing (living people)
Columbia Law School alumni
Simpson Thacher & Bartlett partners